Blondie Takes a Vacation is a 1939 American black-and-white comedy film directed by Frank R. Strayer and starring Penny Singleton, Arthur Lake, and Larry Simms. The film is based on Chic Young's comic strip of the same name.

This was the third of 28 films based on the comic strip; Columbia Pictures produced them from 1938 to 1943.

Plot

The Bumsteads finally take a vacation at a mountain lake, but discover the failing hotel is about to be foreclosed on for lack of business, and its utilities cut off. Dagwood generously pitches in with schemes to help the elderly and bewildered proprietors attract more business.

Cast
 Penny Singleton as Blondie
 Arthur Lake as Dagwood
 Larry Simms as Baby Dumpling
 Daisy as Daisy the Dog
 Danny Mummert as Alvin Fuddle
 Donald Meek as Jonathan N. Gillis
 Donald MacBride as Harvey Morton
 Thomas W. Ross as Matthew Dickerson
 Elizabeth Dunn as Mrs. Emily Dickerson
 Robert Wilcox as John Larkin
 Harlan Briggs as Mr. Holden
 Irving Bacon as Letter Carrier
 Arthur Aylesworth as Sheriff Weaver
 Wade Boteler as Engineer
 Harry Harvey Sr. as Poker Player
 Arthur Housman as Tipsy Train Traveler
 Milton Kibbee as Grocery Creditor
 Christine McIntyre as Resort Singer-'Love in Bloom'
 Robert McKenzie as Plumbing Creditor
 Dave Willock as Hotel Desk Clerk

Production
Production for the film took place in May 1939 to June 1939.

References

External links

 
 
 
 
 

Columbia Pictures films
American black-and-white films
Blondie (film series) films
Films about vacationing
1939 comedy films
1939 films
1930s English-language films
1930s American films